The Metropolitan Riveters (originally the New York Riveters) are a professional women's ice hockey team based in East Rutherford, New Jersey, with home games at the American Dream Meadowlands ice rink.

They were one of the four charter franchises of the National Women's Hockey League (NWHL), now known as the Premier Hockey Federation (PHF).  Its team name and logo are based upon Rosie the Riveter, the subject of the World War II-era motivational poster "We Can Do It!". The Riveters played one season in Brooklyn before moving to the New Jersey Devils practice rink in Newark, New Jersey, in 2016. The team then had a promotional affiliation with the Devils from beginning in 2017 and were renamed the Metropolitan Riveters; the partnership ended in 2019.

History
The first player signed to a contract was Janine Weber, who also became the first player in the history of the NWHL to be signed to a contract. With the first pick overall in the 2015 NWHL Draft, the Riveters selected Alexandra Carpenter, a medalist from the 2014 Sochi Winter Games. The team made its debut in 2015 playing at Aviator Sports & Events Center in Brooklyn, New York. The first player to ever score a goal for the Riveters was Brooke Ammerman. The New York Riveters won their first game against the Boston Pride on November 15, 2015. Nana Fujimoto became the first New York Riveters goaltender to earn a win in the NWHL and the first Japanese born goaltender to win a NWHL game. Meghan Fardelmann became the first Riveter to record a hat trick.

On May 1, 2016, the Riveters signed free agent Amanda Kessel to a one-year deal worth $26,000, making her the highest paid player in the league. At the 2016 NWHL Draft, held in Brooklyn, the Riveters held the first overall pick for the second consecutive year and selected Kelsey Koelzer from the Princeton Tigers women's ice hockey program.

On August 1, 2016, it was announced that the Riveters would move from Brooklyn to Barnabas Health Hockey House at the Prudential Center in Newark, New Jersey.

Prior to their second season in New Jersey, the Riveters announced they had partnered with the New Jersey Devils of the National Hockey League (NHL), becoming the first NWHL team to officially partner with an NHL team. Upon the announcement, the Riveters changed their name to the Metropolitan Riveters to reflect the broader geographic region. The Riveters also adopted the colors of the Devils and changed their jerseys. As part of the new affiliation, the Riveters and Devils held a doubleheader for the Riveters' 2017–18 season opener against the Boston Pride followed by the Devils' game against the Arizona Coyotes at the Prudential Center. In the 2017–18 season, the Riveters won both the regular season and the Isobel Cup against the previous champions, the Buffalo Beauts.

At the end of their 2017–18 championship season, original head coach Chad Wiseman resigned, taking a job closer to home as an assistant with the Guelph Storm, and was replaced by Randy Velischek.

In March 2019, it was announced that the professional level Canadian Women's Hockey League (CWHL) would discontinue operations. In response to the folding of the CWHL, players from both leagues were dissatisfied in the operation of both the NWHL and CWHL in that neither league provided health insurance or a livable salary. Due to these conditions, over 200 players released a joint statement announcing their intent to not participate in any North American professional league for the 2019–20 season. In response, the NWHL committed to pursuing many more sponsors than in previous years in hopes of increasing player salaries.

On May 17, 2019, it was reported that the New Jersey Devils were ending their partnership with the Riveters. Following the dissolution of the partnership, the Riveters no longer had a lease to operate out of Barnabas Health Hockey House at the Prudential Center in Newark, which they had used rent-free as part of their partnership. The team then changed home venues to ProSkate Ice Arena in Monmouth Junction, New Jersey, and returned to their original blue, red, and white colors. The team was eliminated in the semifinal game by the Minnesota Whitecaps prior to the championship being cancelled by the COVID-19 pandemic.

The following season was then delayed amidst the capacity and travel restrictions during the pandemic. The 2020–21 season eventually started on January 23, 2021, with the entire season to be played at Herb Brooks Arena in Lake Placid, New York, without fans in attendance and teams kept in isolation. However, after playing three games, the Riveters were forced to withdraw from the two-week season on January 28 after several members of the organization tested positive for COVID-19.

On May 26, 2021, the league announced the Riveters had been sold to BTM Partners, owners of the Boston Pride and Toronto Six, with John Boynton named the team's chairman.

On September 14, 2022, the Riveters announced that they would play their home games at The Rink at the American Dream Meadowlands retail and entertainment complex for the next three years.

Season-by-season records

Team

Current roster 

 

Coaching staff and team personnel
 Head coach: Venla Hovi
 Associate head coach: Ivo Mocek
 Goaltending coach: Mitch Harris
 Conditioning coach: Krista Gialanella
 Equipment manager: Regina Bataille
 Director of Gameday Operations: Mike Gawbill

Team captains 
 Ashley Johnston, 2015–2018
 Michelle Picard, 2018–19
 Madison Packer, 2019–present

Head coaches 
 Chad Wiseman, 2015–2018
 Randy Velischek, 2018–19
 Ivo Mocek, 2019–2022
 Venla Hovi, 2022–present

General managers 
 Dani Rylan, 2015–16
 Kate Whitman Annis, 2019–2021
 Anya Packer, 2021–22
 Tori Charron, 2022–present

NWHL draft 
A draft lottery was held for the 2015 NWHL Draft, taking place on June 20, 2015. and the New York Riveters earned the first pick overall. With the first pick in the 2015 NWHL Draft, the New York Riveters selected Alexandra Carpenter.

2015 NWHL Draft 

The following were the Riveters selections in the 2015 NWHL Draft on June 20, 2015.

Awards and honors 
 Ashley Johnston, New York Riveters, 2017 NWHL Denna Laing Perseverance Award
 Katie Fitzgerald, New York Riveters, 2017 NWHL Goaltender of the Year

Franchise milestones

References

External links 

 

 
Ice hockey teams in New Jersey
Sports in Newark, New Jersey
Women's ice hockey teams in the United States
Premier Hockey Federation teams
2015 establishments in New York (state)
2016 establishments in New Jersey
Ice hockey clubs established in 2015